Developmental Cell is a peer-reviewed scientific journal of cell and developmental biology. The journal was established in 2001, and is edited by Julie Sollier. It published by Cell Press, an imprint of Elsevier, and its articles becomes open access after an embargo period of one year.

External links

Cell Press academic journals
Delayed open access journals
Developmental biology journals
Molecular and cellular biology journals
Publications established in 2001